Sorbus arvonensis, called the Menai Strait whitebeam or Cerddin Menai, is a whitebeam species in the rose family. It is native to a restricted area along the shore of the Menai Strait in North Wales.  The species was first described by Sell (2014) and has been assessed as Critically Endangered.

Ecology
Sorbus arvonensis is found preferentially growing in areas with limestone bedrock along the southern shore of Menai Strait most often in open woodland or high woodlands habitats. Some individual plants grow along the beach line, with roots exposed to the air or growing down into the beach shingle and immersed in saltwater during high tides.

History and classification
The earliest record of the species is an herbarium specimen collected by William Hunt Painter in 1879. It was noted as a distinct species by Rich (2010) who listed it as "Sorbus un-named taxon", however the species wasn't formally described until 2014.

Conservation status
The highly restricted native range puts the species at risk of extinction due to rising sea level induced habitat erosion. The majority of known specimens are growing within the North Wales Wildlife Trust's, Nantporth Nature Reserve and thus granted conservation protection from the reserve. A total of thirty mature to nearly mature specimens were known as of 2017 and the population has been assessed as currently stable, with an abundant fruiting season documented in 2014. Additionally, two seed bank collections are maintained including one at the Millennium Seed Bank in Wakehurst Place, and an immature specimen, raised from a seedling, was planted in the National Botanic Garden of Wales whitebeam grove in 2019.

Description

References

arvonensis
Menai Strait
Plants described in 2014